Olga Syahputra (1983–2015) was an Indonesian actor, comedian, singer, and television presenter. He often portrayed transvestites to comedic effect.

In 2008, Olga became a TV presenter of music events on Dahsyat, a morning shown on RCTI. His co-presenter since March 2011 was Jessica Iskandar. Olga won the award for Favorite Music/Variety Show Presenter and Favorite Comedian in 2009 Panasonic Awards and 2010 Panasonic Awards published in RCTI, MNCTV, and Global TV. He also starred in movies such as Skandal Cinta Babi Ngepet and Mau Lagi (released as Cintaku Selamanya).

This is a list awards received by Olga Syahputra.

Bintang RPTI Awards

|-
| 2011
| rowspan= "3" | Olga Syahputra
| Favorite Presenter
| 
|-
| 2012
| Celebrity Top Rating of the Year
| 
|-
| 2014
| Favorite Comedian
| 
|-

Dahsyatnya Awards
The Dahsyatnya Awards are annual awards presented by the daily Indonesian TV show Dahsyat that airs on RCTI. Olga has received one award from 2 nominations.

|-
| 2014
| Olga Syahputra Sick
| Outstanding Moment
| 
|-
| 2016
| Olga Syahputra
| Outstanding Host
| 
|-

Fokus Selebriti Awards

|-
| 2013
| rowspan= "2" | Olga Syahputra
| Focused Male Celebrity
| 
|-
| 2015
| Hottest News
| 
|-

Global Seru Awards
The Global Seru Awards are awarded to celebrities who have caught the attention of the public through interesting or exciting accomplishments.

|-
| 2014
| Olga Syahputra
| Most Exciting Comedian
| 
|-

Insert Awards

|-
| 2011
| rowspan= "2" | Olga Syahputra
| The Funniest Celebrity
| 
|-
| 2014
| Lifetime Achievement Awards
| 
|-

Nickelodeon Indonesia Kids' Choice Awards
The Nickelodeon Indonesia Kids' Choice Awards is Indonesian version of Nickelodeon Kids' Choice Awards, held since 2008 in Jakarta. Olga has received two awards from 7 nominations.

|-
| 2009
| rowspan= "7" | Olga Syahputra
| rowspan= "3" | Favorite Presenter
| 
|-
| 2010
| 
|-
| rowspan= "2" | 2011
| 
|-
| rowspan= "4" | Favorite Comedian
| 
|-
| 2012
| 
|-
| 2013
| 
|-
| 2014
| 
|-

Obsesi Awards

|-
| 2015
| Olga Syahputra
| Most Obsession Male
| 
|-

OVJ Awards
The OVJ Awards are awards for the cast of the television show Opera Van Java, both regular and guest stars. Olga has received one award from two nominations.

|-
| 2011
| Olga Syahputra vs. Vincent
| Best Battle
| 
|-
| 2013
| Olga Syahputra
| Most Shocked Artist
| 
|-

Panasonic Awards
The Panasonic Awards is an award presented to television programs and individuals, based on poll results. The poll was originally conducted by the Indonesian tabloid Citra, but was taken over by Nielsen Media Research in 2004. Olga received eight awards from 19 nominations.

|-
| rowspan= "2" | 2009
| rowspan= "4" | Dahsyat
| Favorite Music/Variety Show Presenter
| 
|-
| Favorite Comedian
| 
|-
| rowspan= "3" | 2010
| Favorite Music/Variety Show Presenter
| 
|-
| Favorite Comedian
| 
|-
| Online
| Favorite Talkshow Presenter
| 
|-
| rowspan= "3" | 2011
| rowspan= "5" | Dahsyat
| Favorite Music/Variety Show Presenter
| 
|-
| Favorite Comedian
| 
|-
| Favorite Talkshow Presenter
| 
|-
| rowspan= "5" | 2012
| Favorite Music/Variety Show Presenter
| 
|-
| Favorite Entertainment Talkshow Presenter
| 
|-
| Pesbukers
| Favorite Comedian
| 
|-
| Tarung Dangdut
| Favorite Talent Show Presenter
| 
|-
| Catatan Si Olga
| Favorite Reality Show Presenter
| 
|-
| rowspan= "3" | 2013
| Pesbukers
| Favorite Comedian
| 
|-
| Catatan Si Olga
| Favorite Reality Show Presenter
| 
|-
| Dahsyat
| Favorite Music/Variety Show Presenter
| 
|-
| rowspan= "2" | 2014
| Pesbukers
| Favorite Comedian
| 
|-
| Dahsyat
| Favorite Entertainment Program Presenter
| 
|-
| 2015
| Pesbukers
| Favorite Comedian
| 
|-

Silet Awards
The Silet Awards is an annual awards show held by the infotainment show Silet for artists and shows broadcast on RCTI. Olga received one award from two nominations.

|-
| 2014
| rowspan= "2" | Olga Syahputra
| Razored Life Story
| 
|-
| 2015
| Special Award
|

Yahoo! OMG Awards

|-
| 2012
| Olga Syahputra Insult Islam
| Hottest Scandal
| 
|-
| 2013
| Olga Syahputra
| Most Talked About
| 
|-

YKS Romantic Awards
The YKS Romantic Awards is an awards show presented by Yuk Keep Smile, a TV show which is broadcast on Trans TV. The awards show is held on February 14 every year to coincide with Valentine Day. Olga received two awards.

|-
| rowspan= "2" | 2014
| rowspan= "2" | Olga Syahputra
| Most Surprised Artist
| 
|-
| Most Lulled Artist
| 
|-

References

Syahputra, Olga
Syahputra, Olga